Amber's fourth album is titled My Kind of World. Amber co-wrote 10 of the 12 songs on the album. The album features three singles: "You Move Me", "Voodoo" and "Just Like That."

Track listing
  "Crucified Solitude"
  "You Move Me"
  "Voodoo"
  "Same Old Paradise"
  "Sacrificial Lamb"
  "Private War"
  "When a Love Grows Cold 
  "Just Like That (Romeo and Juliet)"
  "City of Pain"
  "Your Kind of World"
  "More Time for a Child"
  "Don't Follow Me Home"

Singles

You Move Me 
Released in 2004, it swiftly climbed the dance and club charts following its release, though it has received no mainstream radio support. "You Move Me" achieved a #4 peak on the Billboard Hot Dance Music/Club Play chart in September.

Voodoo 
The Maxi Single "Voodoo" was released in June 2005. It peaked at #13 on the Hot Dance Music/Club Play.

Just Like That 
The third and final single lifted from "My Kind of World", "Just Like That", released in 2005, is as of February 2006 a Top Ten Dance Format Radio hit in America. "Just Like That" peaked at #6 on the Hot Dance Music/Club Play chart.

References

2004 albums
Amber (singer) albums